Anarestan (also Romanized as Anārestān; also known as Nārestān) is a city in Riz District of Jam County, Bushehr province, Iran. At the 2006 census, its population was 1,857 in 409 households, when it was a village. The following census in 2011 counted 2,735 people in 658 households, by which time it had been elevated to the status of a city. The latest census in 2016 showed a population of 3,400 people in 904 households.

References 

Cities in Bushehr Province
Populated places in Jam County